Messier 70 or M70, also known as NGC 6681, is a globular cluster of stars to be found in the south of Sagittarius. It was discovered by Charles Messier in 1780. The famous comet Hale–Bopp was discovered near this cluster in 1995. 

It is roughly the same size and luminosity as its neighbour in space, M69. This cluster has undergone core collapse, leaving it centrally concentrated with the luminosity distribution following a power law.

There are two distinct stellar populations in the cluster, with each displaying unique abundance abundances. These likely represent different generations of stars. Five known variable stars lie within the broadest radius, the tidal radius, of it, all of which are RR Lyrae variables. The cluster may have two blue stragglers near the core.

Gallery

See also
 List of Messier objects

References and footnotes

External links

 Messier 70, Galactic Globular Clusters Database page
 

Globular clusters
Sagittarius (constellation)
070
NGC objects
Astronomical objects discovered in 1780